The 2004 La Flèche Wallonne was the 68th edition of La Flèche Wallonne cycle race and was held on 21 April 2004. The race started in Charleroi and finished in Huy. The race was won by Davide Rebellin of the Gerolsteiner team.

General classification

References

2004 in road cycling
2004
2004 in Belgian sport